Fairview Mountain (sometimes called Mount Fairview) is a mountain in Banff National Park situated along the southeastern shoreline of Lake Louise. The mountain was named in 1894 by Walter Wilcox, which reflects the view from the top. An alternate name for the peak is Goat Mountain although it is rarely referred to as such.

While imposing cliffs seen from Lake Louise may indicate a difficult climb, the mountain is easily ascended by experienced hikers via a trail around the backside on the southern slopes of the mountain.

Geology

Fairview Mountain is composed of sedimentary rock laid down during the Cambrian period. Formed in shallow seas, this sedimentary rock was pushed east and over the top of younger rock during the Laramide orogeny.

Climate

Based on the Köppen climate classification, Fairview is located in a subarctic climate zone with cold, snowy winters, and mild summers. Winter temperatures can drop below −20 °C with wind chill factors below −30 °C.

See also
List of mountains in the Canadian Rockies

References

Gallery

External links 

 Fairview Mountain: Weather forecast
 Parks Canada web site: Banff National Park

Two-thousanders of Alberta
Mountains of Banff National Park
Canadian Rockies